Johann Samuel Welter (27 August 1650, in Obersontheim – 27 July 1720, in Schwäbisch Hall) was a German composer.

Recordings
Johann Samuel Welter - Gott sey uns gnädig  ecco la musica, Heike Hümmer, Matthias Sprinz Christophorus, 2019

References

German Baroque composers
1650 births
1720 deaths